Brownwood is an unincorporated community in northern Stoddard County, Missouri, United States. It is located twenty miles north of Dexter.

A post office called Brownwood has been in operation since 1882.

References

Unincorporated communities in Stoddard County, Missouri
Unincorporated communities in Missouri
1882 establishments in Missouri
Populated places established in 1882